Epipyrops malagassica is a moth in the family Epipyropidae. It was described by Karl Jordan in 1928. It is found on Madagascar.

References

Moths described in 1928
Epipyropidae